Bro's Before Ho's is a 2013 Dutch comedy film directed by Steffen Haars and Flip van der Kuil. The film music was scored by The Flexican and Sef.

Summary
The film is about two brothers (video store employee Max and supermarket assistant manager Jules), who, following urgent advice from their father, swore as a child that they would never have a relationship with a woman. They go out all the time and get one girl after another in bed (and Jules often has sex in the store's warehouse with female subordinates too), but dump these girls again just as easily. Until they both fall in love with Anna, a counselor for mentally disabled people, including Jordy, who becomes restless and violent when he can't watch porn movies.

Jules and Anna decide to move in together, whereupon Max acts very cool towards Anna. Jules changes his mind, however: living together is not for him, and he also allows Max to have a relationship with Anna. Anna is initially angry with Max, also because he unintentionally caused Anna to be fired (because he gave porn DVDs to Jordy after the death of his boss and the video store closed, for which Anna is blamed). but in the end (after Jules and Max stay in prison after a clash with the police when they are out with the disabled unauthorized) things work out well between them.

In between there is also the storyline of René, friend of Max and Jules, whose girlfriend Suzanne is breaking up. It will eventually work out between them, too.

Cast
Tim Haars as Max
 as Jules
Sylvia Hoeks as Anna
 as Suzanne
Birgit Schuurman as Mercedes
 as Jordy

Trivia
The scene in which Max orders porn films by phone is taken from the American film Clerks (1994).
During the credits, scenes from Pulp Fiction, Jaws, Menace II Society, Rocky, Braveheart, Fight Club, New Kids Turbo and American History X are re-enacted.
The events at the mentally disabled facility are taken from One Flew Over the Cuckoo's Nest.

References

External links

2013 comedy films
Dutch comedy films